Raoul G. Cantero III (born Raoul Roberto Garcia-Cantero y Batista; 1 August 1960) is a Florida lawyer and a former justice of the Florida Supreme Court.

Career
Born in Madrid, Spain, Cantero graduated from Florida State University as an undergraduate and from Harvard University's law school and a Fulbright Scholar. Prior to his appointment to the Florida Supreme Court, he was a shareholder in the Miami firm of Adorno & Yoss.

On July 10, 2002, Governor Jeb Bush appointed Cantero to the Florida Supreme Court. Cantero had not previously served as a judge, although he had extensive experience as an appellate attorney. Cantero is regarded as the first Florida Supreme Court Justice of Hispanic descent, contrasting with Rosemary Barkett who was the first Justice to meet the Census criteria for being Hispanic due to her birth in Mexico to Syrian parents and the fact that her first language was Spanish.

During the George W. Bush presidency he was mentioned as a potential Supreme Court nominee.

On April 11, 2008, Cantero announced he would resign from the Florida Supreme Court, due to his family's desire to return to Miami, their hometown.  His last day on the court was September 6, 2008.  He had announced his intention to thereafter join leading international law firm White & Case LLP as a partner in the Miami office and head of the Miami Appellate Practice group.

Family

His father is Raoul Garcia-Cantero y Parajon (born 1935) and his mother is Elisa Aleida Batista y Godinez (born 1933). He married Ana Maria Perdomo (born 1963) on June 17, 1983 and they have three children. He attended the Sisters of St. Joseph-run St. Theresa School in Coral Gables, Florida and later graduated high School from the Marist-Brothers-run Christopher Columbus High School (Miami, Florida) in Miami. His maternal grandfather was former Cuban dictator Fulgencio Batista.

See also
List of Hispanic/Latino American jurists

References

External links
Florida Supreme Court page on Raoul G. Cantero III
 The Miami Herald, April 12, 2008, "First Cuban Justice Says He Will Leave the Bench" by Marc Caputo, Page 1B

Justices of the Florida Supreme Court
Living people
1960 births
Florida State University alumni
Harvard Law School alumni
Cuban Roman Catholics
Spanish people of Cuban descent
People from Madrid
Lawyers from Miami
Hispanic and Latino American judges
American judges of Cuban descent
Christopher Columbus High School (Miami-Dade County, Florida) alumni